Bruno António Monteiro Magalhães (born 25 January 1982 in Barcelos, Braga District) is a former Portuguese professional footballer who played as a midfielder.

References

External links

1982 births
Living people
People from Barcelos, Portugal
Portuguese footballers
Association football midfielders
Liga Portugal 2 players
Segunda Divisão players
S.C. Braga B players
G.D. Ribeirão players
G.D. Chaves players
S.C. Freamunde players
SC Mirandela players
Sportspeople from Braga District